Killymard is a parish, in the barony of Bannagh in the county of Donegal, and province of Ulster.

Railways
The Killymard Halt railway station opened on 18 August 1893 on the Donegal Railway Company line from Donegal to Killybegs.

It closed on 1 November 1956.

References

Townlands
 Townlands

Photographs
 Geograph
 Google

External links
 Donegal Genealogy
 Genuki
 Catholic Church
 Anglican Church

Civil parishes of County Donegal